The 1873 Northern West Riding of Yorkshire by-election was fought on 27 August 1873.  The byelection was fought due to the incumbent Liberal MP, Lord Frederick Cavendish, becoming Lord Commissioner of the Treasury.  It was retained by Cavendish, who was unopposed.

References

1873 elections in the United Kingdom
1873 in England
19th century in Yorkshire
August 1873 events
By-elections to the Parliament of the United Kingdom in Yorkshire and the Humber constituencies
Unopposed ministerial by-elections to the Parliament of the United Kingdom in English constituencies